Abdellah Béhar (born 5 July 1963 in Souk Arba du Gharb) is a retired Moroccan-born French runner who specializes in the 5000 metres and cross-country running.

Achievements

Personal bests
3000 metres - 7:35.80 min (1996)
5000 metres - 13:13.33 min (1998)
10,000 metres - 27:42.57 min (1996)
Half marathon - 1:01:30 hrs (2000)
Marathon - 2:09:05 hrs (2001)

External links

1963 births
Living people
French male long-distance runners
Athletes (track and field) at the 1996 Summer Olympics
Athletes (track and field) at the 2000 Summer Olympics
Olympic athletes of France
French sportspeople of Moroccan descent